90 Feet Road is the southern segment of the Srinagar-Leh Highway (National Highway 1D), which connects Srinagar with Ladakh. The 90 Feet Road begins in Soura, Srinagar, about 11.1 km north of the commercial centre of Lal Chowk. Thereafter, NH 1D turns eastward toward Leh.

Locals call it Nammath, which is "ninety" in the Kashmiri language.

History
The road was built in the early 21st century by clearing the existing clay dunes. It is considered one of the most prestigious roads in the city.

In the neighborhood of Wontabowan, east of the 90 Feet Road, is Awanta Bhawan, a historical site built by Queen Amrita Prabha, whose husband, Meghwahana, was one of the Buddhist kings of Kashmir. The 90 Feet Road speeds access for Ganderbal residents to medical care, such as at the Sher-i-Kashmir Institute of Medical Sciences.

Other such roads
The name "90 Feet Road" is not unique to Srinagar; India has several other roads by the same name, such as one in the Dharavi neighborhood of Mumbai.

See also
 Soura
 Buchpora
 Buddhism in Kashmir
 Green Valley Educational Institute

Gallery

References

National highways in India
Transport in Kashmir Division
Transport in Ladakh